The following is a list of notable people who were born or who live or formerly lived in the city of Miami, Florida.

Artists and designers 
 Jorge Arango (1917–2007), Colombian-born architect
 Hernan Bas, visual artist
 Clandestine Culture, contemporary artist
Sebastian Spreng, visual artist and journalist
 Robert Law Weed, architect
 Kat Reeder, Peruvian-born illustrator, graphic designer, and artist
 Arturo Rodríguez (born 1956), Cuban-born painter
 Cesar Santos (born 1982), Cuban-born painter
 Purvis Young (1943–2010), painter

Authors, writers, and journalists
 T. D. Allman, foreign correspondent, historian
 Dave Barry, columnist and humorist
 James Carlos Blake, fiction writer and essayist
 Edna Buchanan, novelist and Miami journalist (born in Paterson, New Jersey)
 Patricia Cornwell, novelist
 Daína Chaviano, author of historical, scifi & fantasy novels, born in Havana (Cuba).
Reed Cowan, journalist
 Jennine Capó Crucet, novelist, essayist, short story writer
 Marjory Stoneman Douglas, conservationist and writer of fiction and non-fiction
 Eric Garcia, writer whose Matchstick Men was adapted into a movie
 Dr. Lillian Glass, body-language expert, author, columnist, TV commentator
 Thomas Harris, author of novels featuring Hannibal Lecter
 Carl Hiaasen, novelist and former Miami Herald columnist, originally from Plantation, Florida
 Dan Le Batard, columnist and sports radio host
 Jeff Lindsay, author of novels featuring Dexter Morgan
 Tom Llamas, ABC and NBC News correspondent
 Kirk Munroe, author of children's books
 Chris Myers, sportscaster and host of The Chris Myers Interview
 Ferdie Pacheco, Muhammad Ali's cornerman and doctor, TV commentator, artist, writer
 Amy Serrano, poet, essayist, author, filmmaker

Actors and entertainers

Business 
Benjamin Breier, president, chief executive officer and member of the board of directors for Kindred Healthcare
Terri Dial, former leader of Citigroup's North American consumer banking business
Blake Ross, co-founder of Mozilla Firefox

Criminals
 William Calley, war criminal
 Al Capone, infamous Chicago mobster
 Adolfo Constanzo, Cuban-American serial killer
 Jonathan James, youngest person ever to be incarcerated for cybercrime in the United States

Musicians and singers
 Luther Campbell, rapper, aka Luke, former leader of 2 Live Crew
 Steve Aoki, DJ
 David Archuleta, singer
 Giselle Bellas, singer-songwriter
 Booba, rapper
 Brisco, rapper
 Camila Cabello, former member of Fifth Harmony, born in Cuba, relocated to the United States at age 5
 Kat Dahlia, rapper
 Tego Calderón, rapper born in Puerto Rico who moved to and attended high school in Miami
 Harry Wayne Casey, better known as "KC" of KC and the Sunshine Band
 Willy Chirino, salsa singer 
 Phil Collins, singer-songwriter, multi-instrumentalist, record producer, and actor, lives in Miami 
 Cool and Dre, team of hip-hop producers
 Celia Cruz, salsa music singer
 Denzel Curry, rapper
 Christian Daniel, singer-songwriter and actor, moved to Miami in 2007
 DaniLeigh, singer
 Craig David, British singer
 Jason Derulo, singer-songwriter
 DJ Craze, Nicaraguan American, only DJ in history to win three consecutive World DMC Champion titles
 DJ Khaled, rapper, born in New Orleans but raised and lives in Miami.
 DJ Laz, rapper, DJ
 DJ Uncle Al, local hip hop DJ
 Dunk Ryders, rap group
 Gloria Estefan, Latin pop singer-songwriter
 Expose, freestyle group
 Flo Rida, rapper
 Sage Francis, alternative hip hop artist
 Barry Gibb, lead vocalist in Bee Gees
 Deborah Harry, singer of Blondie
 Brooke Hogan, pop and R&B singer; daughter of Hulk Hogan
 Ace Hood, rapper
 Julio Iglesias, Latin artist
 I Set My Friends on Fire, post-hardcore band
 Enrique Iglesias, Spanish singer-songwriter
 Iron & Wine, folk rock singer-songwriter 
 Jacki-O, rapper
 Lauren Jauregui, singer-songwriter, former member of Fifth Harmony
 MC Jin, rapper and actor
 JT Money, rapper
 Victoria Justice, actress and singer
 Sean Kingston
 LunchMoney Lewis, singer
 Lil Pump, rapper (real name: Gazzy Garcia)
 Yngwie Malmsteen, Swedish-born heavy metal guitarist, now resides in Miami with his family
 Ky-Mani Marley, reggae singer, actor, son of Bob Marley
 Ricky Martin, Latin pop singer
 ¡Mayday!, rap group signed to Strange Music
 George McCrae, soul music singer
 Syesha Mercado
 Samuel David Moore, of Sam & Dave
 Damien Moyal, singer and musician
 Brianna Perry, rapper and actress, originating from Dade County
 Pitbull, Cuban American rapper who mentions "Dade County" in several songs
 Pleasure P, singer
 Poison Clan, rap group
 Iggy Pop, singer-songwriter, musician, record producer, and actor, born in Muskegon, but lives in Miami
 Pretty Ricky, rap and R&B group
 Red Spyda, producer, hip-hop R&B
 Rick Ross, rapper
 Paulina Rubio, Mexican Latin pop singer 
 Santaye, singer-songwriter
 Jon Secada, singer-songwriter, Latin pop singer
 Smitty, rapper
 Smokepurpp, rapper born in Chicago but grew up in Miami
 Frida Sofía, Mexican-born singer-songwriter, media personality and fashion model
 Spaceghostpurrp, rapper
 Stevie B, freestyle music singer
 Stitches, rapper
 Jessica Sutta, of the girl group Pussycat Dolls
 Malu Trevejo, Cuban-born singer 
 Trick Daddy, rapper
 Trina, rapper
 Will to Power, freestyle group
 Marion Williams, gospel music singer
 Betty Wright, Grammy Award-winning singer-songwriter
 City Girls, rap group

Politicians, civil servants, and activists

 Victor Agosto, anti-war activist
George P. Bush, businessman, son of Jeb Bush and nephew of George W. Bush, serves as the Commissioner of the Texas General Land Office
Jeb Bush, politician, 43rd governor of Florida
Mattie Belle Davis, judge
Anitere Flores, politician
Carlos A. Giménez, former firefighter and mayor of Miami-Dade County, U.S. Congressman
Carlos López-Cantera, politician
Scott James Meyer, attorney and former stand-up comedian
Yeshimabeit Milner, technologist and activist
Ileana Ros-Lehtinen, U.S. Congresswoman
Marco Rubio, U.S. Senator, attorney
Maria Elvira Salazar, journalist for Telemundo, CNN Español and Univision, television news anchor, U.S. Congresswoman
Enrique Tarrio, leader of the Proud Boys, director of Latinos for Trump

Sports

Autoracing
Bobby Allison and family, NASCAR drivers
Zach Banks, racing driver
Enzo Fittipaldi, Formula 3 driver
Pietro Fittipaldi, Indycar and Formula One driver
Bobby Johns, NASCAR driver
Tony Kanaan, 2013 Indianapolis 500 Champion, 2004 IndyCar Series Champion and 2015 Rolex 24 Hours at Daytona overall winner
Carlos Munoz, IndyCar Series racing driver
Juan Pablo Montoya, 2001 and 2015 Indianapolis 500 Champion and Formula One racing driver

Baseball

Basketball

Football

Golf
 Daniel Berger (born 1993), professional PGA Tour golfer
Erik Compton, professional golfer

Mixed martial artists
Alex Caceres, mixed martial artist fighting in the UFC
Jorge Masvidal, mixed martial artist fighting in the UFC
Mike Rio, professional mixed martial arts fighter, former member of the UFC
Kimbo Slice, Bahamian-American mixed martial artist, boxer, professional wrestler and occasional actor

Tennis

Jodi Appelbaum-Steinbauer (born 1956), former professional tennis player
Jay Berger (born 1966), former tennis player; highest world ranking # 7
Anne Grousbeck (born 1966)
Anna Kournikova, professional tennis player
Van Winitsky (born 1959), former tennis player ranked World No. 7 in doubles

Multiple disciplines
 Eddy Alvarez (born 1990), Olympic short track speed skater and baseball player, and Major League Baseball second baseman

Other sports
Fannie Barrios, IFBB professional bodybuilder
Fabiano Caruana, former United States Chess champion
Lisa Cross, IFBB professional bodybuilder
Layla El, WWE wrestler
Justin Garces, MLS soccer player for Atlanta United
Margie Goldstein-Engle (born 1958), equestrian
Brian Ginsberg (born 1966), gymnast, two-time US junior national gymnastics champion
Hulk Hogan, professional wrestler, actor
Ashleigh Johnson (born 1994), water polo goalkeeper
Glen Johnson, former world light heavyweight boxing champion
Jorge Masvidal, mixed martial artist fighting in the UFC
Floyd Mayweather Jr., professional boxer, boxing promoter
Yaxeni Oriquen-Garcia, IFBB professional bodybuilder
Hans Pienitz (born 1988), American-born German professional ice hockey player
Andrew Talansky, professional cyclist
Betty Viana-Adkins, IFBB professional bodybuilder
Montel Vontavious Porter (MVP), professional wrestler
Henry Westmoreland, retired American soccer player

Miscellaneous
 Stephanie Abrams, meteorologist at the Weather Channel since 2003
 Nina Agdal, Danish model
 Richard A. Appelbaum, U.S. Coast Guard rear admiral
 Don Aronow, speedboat builder and racer
 Stephanie Berman-Eisenberg, supportive housing developer
 Black Chiney, Jamaican sound system
 Leslie Cochran, Austin, Texas, resident who personified "Keep Austin Weird"
 Kyan Douglas, star of Queer Eye for the Straight Guy
 Howard Engle (1919–2009), physician and lead plaintiff in a landmark lawsuit against the tobacco industry
 Manuel J. Fernandez, U.S. Air Force fighter ace; raised in Miami
 Roy Firestone, TV personality
 Don Francisco, TV host
 Kid Fury, vlogger and co-host of podcast The Read
 Dave Graveline, talk radio host
 Leroy Griffith, theater and club proprietor
 Charlie Hall, firefighter and member of the Florida House of Representatives
 Christina Hattler, fashion designer
 Richard L. Hoxie, U.S. Army brigadier general
 Arefeh Mansouri, fashion and costume designer 
 Jeanine Mason, winner of So You Think You Can Dance (Season 5) 
 Ana Navarro, political strategist, political commentator for CNN 
 Edward C. Peter II, U.S. Army lieutenant general; raised in Miami
 Allen Lawrence Pope, former military and paramilitary aviator who was shot down over Indonesia during the Permesta Rebellion
 Brett Ratner, director of the Rush Hour films
 Albert Reed, model, Dancing with the Stars
 Crystal Renn, plus-size model
 Daniel Schechter, child psychiatrist and researcher
 Robert L. Shevin, politician and judge
 O.J. Simpson, football player, actor
 Ondi Timoner, film director
 Dayanara Torres, Miss Universe 1993
 Rick Tyler, white supremacist and political candidate from Tennessee.
 Pedro Zamora, AIDS educator and The Real World: San Francisco television personality

See also
List of Florida International University people
List of University of Miami alumni

References

 
Miami
Miami
Miami-related lists